Dropkin is a surname. Notable people with the surname include:

Celia Dropkin (1887–1956), Russian-born American poet
Korey Dropkin (born 1995), American curler